Louredo is a former civil parish in the municipality of Santa Maria da Feira, Portugal. In 2013, the parish merged into the new parish Lobão, Gião, Louredo e Guisande. It has a population of 1,459 inhabitants and a total area of 8.67 km2.

References

Former parishes of Santa Maria da Feira